is a Japanese manga artist. After working as an assistant to Toshiaki Iwashiro, he created the one-shot Hungry Joker, which was later serialized as a full series. After its conclusion, he launched Black Clover.

Biography
Yūki Tabata was born in Fukuoka Prefecture, Japan. Before launching his own series, he worked as an assistant to Toshiaki Iwashiro. This one-shot was later turned into a full series, which ran in Weekly Shōnen Jump from 2012 to 2013.

Following Hungry Jokers completion, Tabata published another one-shot, titled Black Clover, in Shōnen Jump Next!!. This one-shot was later turned into a full series, which started serialization in Weekly Shōnen Jump on February 16, 2015. Soon after Black Clovers debut as a full series, Tabata got married. In the first half of 2017, Black Clover was the 28th best-selling manga in Japan. One year later, the entire Black Clover media franchise was the 24th best-selling media franchise in Japan. The series has been given numerous adaptations, notably an anime television series.

Style
Tabata stated that when making stories, he wants to give each character a chance in the spotlight. When it comes to the characters, he likes to give each a defining trait to make them memorable to the reader. As for their designs, he stated that he likes to have fun drawing, so if part of a character's design frustrates him, he changes it.

Influences
Tabata has cited Akira Toriyama's Dragon Ball as a major influence over his work, even stating it was one of the main reasons he decided to become a manga artist. Tabata has also cited Kentaro Miura's Berserk and Tite Kubo's Bleach as sources of inspiration.

Works
Hungry Joker (2012–2013) (serialized in Weekly Shōnen Jump)
 (2015–present) (serialized in Weekly Shōnen Jump)

References

External links
 

Living people
Manga artists from Fukuoka Prefecture
Year of birth missing (living people)